The 2011–12 Women's EHF Challenge Cup was the 18th edition of the European Handball Federation's third-tier competition for women's handball clubs, running from 30 September 2011 to 12 May 2012. It was won by Le Havre from France.

First qualifying round

Group A

Group B

Second qualifying round

Round of 16

Quarter-finals

Semifinals

Finals

References

Women's EHF Challenge Cup
EHF Challenge Cup
EHF Challenge Cup